Bremen Water Tower, also known as Bremen Water Works Standpipe, is a historic water tower located at Bremen, Marshall County, Indiana.  It was built in 1892, and consists of a 68 foot tall brick base with Second Gothic Revival style design elements topped by a 36 foot tall tank.  The base sits on a limestone foundation and is 13 feet in diameter.  It was taken out of commission in 1955.  It remains a community icon and was named an American Historic Water Landmark in 1975.

It was listed on the National Register of Historic Places in 2013.

References

Water towers in the United States
Water towers on the National Register of Historic Places
Industrial buildings and structures on the National Register of Historic Places in Indiana
Gothic Revival architecture in Indiana
Infrastructure completed in 1892
Buildings and structures in Marshall County, Indiana
National Register of Historic Places in Marshall County, Indiana